Fabián Urbina ( 2000-19 June 2017) was a Venezuelan protester killed during the 2017 Venezuelan protests.

Killing 
Urbina had been already wounded during a protest on 17 March near Universidad Pedagógica Experimental Libertador in Maracay. On 19 June 2017, Urbina was participating in a protest at the Altamira distributor in Caracas when a National Guardsman fired a pistol at protesters, fatally wounding him and injuring five more. Urbina was transferred to the El Ávila clinic, where he was admitted without vital signs at the age of 17. The Public Ministry identified those responsible and ordered their arrest. Interior Ministry Néstor Reverol admitted that the National Guard was responsible for his death.

A march in memory of Fabián Urbina was scheduled for 20 June; although it was rescheduled to 21 June due to the passing of Tropical Storm Bret, many still appeared to demonstrate through the storm. The following day, hundreds marched to the Organization of American States (OAS) headquarters in eastern Caracas, passing the spot where Fabian Urbina was shot dead by the National Guardsman.

On 13 July, a night march was summoned in honor of those killed during the protests, including Urbina, marching to the places where the demonstrators died. Dissident CICPC inspector Óscar Pérez made a surprise appearance in the march, before leaving and disappearing.

The killing of Fabián Urbina was documented in a report by a panel of independent experts from the OAS, considering that it could constitute a crime against humanity committed in Venezuela along with other killings during the protests.

See also 

 Armando Cañizales
 Miguel Castillo
 Neomar Lander
 Paúl Moreno
 Jairo Ortiz
 Juan Pablo Pernalete
 Paola Ramírez
 Xiomara Scott
 David Vallenilla
 Timeline of the 2017 Venezuelan protests

References 

2000 births
2017 deaths
Deaths by firearm in Venezuela
Deaths by person in Venezuela
Filmed killings
Male murder victims
People murdered in Venezuela
People shot dead by law enforcement officers
2017 Venezuelan protests
Victims of police brutality
Year of birth uncertain
2017 murders in Venezuela